The 2007 Pittsburgh Steelers season was the franchise's 75th season as a professional sports franchise and as a member of the National Football League. It was the 8th season under leadership of general manager Kevin Colbert and the first under head coach Mike Tomlin, after going 8–8 last season. The Steelers finished the year at 10–6. However, they lost 31–29 at home to the Jacksonville Jaguars in the Wild Card round.

Personnel

Staff

Notable additions include; LaMarr Woodley, Lawrence Timmons, Daniel Sepulveda, William Gay.

Roster

2007 NFL Draft
The 2007 NFL Draft took place at Radio City Music Hall in New York City on April 28 and April 29, 2007. The Steelers selected eight players in six rounds.

Schedule

Preseason

Regular season 

Note: Intra-divisional opponents are in bold text.

Standings

Pro Bowl selections

Six players from the Steelers were selected to play in the 2008 Pro Bowl.  Two started (bold), two were selected to the reserve squad, and two did not play due to injury.

 No. 7 Ben Roethlisberger – Quarterback (reserve)
 No. 39 Willie Parker – Running back (injured, did not play)
 No. 43 Troy Polamalu – Strong safety (injured, did not play)
 No. 66 Alan Faneca – Offensive guard
 No. 92 James Harrison – Outside linebacker
 No. 98 Casey Hampton – Defensive tackle (reserve)

Regular season

Week 1 (Sunday September 9, 2007): at Cleveland Browns 

The Steelers began their anniversary season on the road against their AFC North foe, the Cleveland Browns, for Round 1 of the 2007 Rust Belt series.  Also, with both teams at 55 wins a piece, the Steelers would take the lead in the rivalry for the first time in the 57-year history of the rivalry.

Pittsburgh got off to a fast start in the first quarter as QB Ben Roethlisberger completed a 5-yard TD pass to WR Hines Ward. Later, kicker Jeff Reed made a 26-yard field goal, while Roethlisberger completed a 40-yard TD pass to WR Santonio Holmes.  After a scoreless second quarter, the Steelers went right back to work in the third quarter, as Roethlisberger completed a 5-yard TD pass to rookie TE Matt Spaeth.  Afterwards, the Browns got their only score of the game as QB Derek Anderson completed a 1-yard TD pass to FB Lawrence Vickers.  Pittsburgh put the game well out of reach as Roethlisberger threw his career-best 4th touchdown pass of the game, a 22-yard strike to TE Heath Miller.  In the fourth quarter, Pittsburgh wrapped up the win with Reed's 31-yard field goal.

With the win, the Steelers began the year at 1–0, gave Mike Tomlin his first win as a head coach, and took the lead in the Rust Belt series with win #56.

Scoring Drives:

Q1 – PIT – 11:49 – 5-yard TD pass from Ben Roethlisberger to Hines Ward (Jeff Reed kick) (7–0 PIT)
Q1 – PIT – 8:53 – Jeff Reed 26-yard FG (14–0 PIT)
Q1 – PIT – 0:58 – 40-yard TD pass from Ben Roethlisberger to Santonio Holmes (Reed kick) (17–0 PIT)
Q3 – PIT – 10:33 – 5-yard TD pass from Ben Roethlisberger to Matt Spaeth (Reed kick) (24–0 PIT)
Q3 – CLE – 6:52 – 1-yard TD pass from Derek Anderson to Lawrence Vickers (Phil Dawson kick) (24–7 PIT)
Q3 – PIT – 2:23 – 22-yard TD pass from Ben Roethlisberger to Heath Miller (Reed kick) (31–7 PIT)
Q4 – PIT – 7:12 – Jeff Reed 31-yard FG (34–7 PIT)

Week 2 (Sunday September 16, 2007): vs. Buffalo Bills 

Coming off their easy road win over the Browns, the Steelers debuted their special throwback uniforms and clashed with the Buffalo Bills in a Week 2 home opener.  In the first half, despite the early struggles on offense, the defense kept the Bills back.  Meanwhile, kicker Jeff Reed scored a 34-yard field goal in the first quarter, and added 28-yard and 39-yard field goals in the second quarter.  In the third quarter, Buffalo would get their only score against Pittsburgh, as kicker Rian Lindell got a 24-yard field goal.  Afterwards, the Steelers took over for the rest of the game as QB Ben Roethlisberger completed a 1-yard TD pass to rookie TE Matt Spaeth.  In the fourth quarter, Pittsburgh closed out the game with RB Willie Parker getting an 11-yard TD run.

With the win, the Steelers improved to 2–0.

Week 3 (Sunday September 23, 2007): vs. San Francisco 49ers 

In Week 3 against the San Francisco 49ers, the Steelers found themselves trailing for the first time on the young season as the 49ers drove deep into Pittsburgh territory before being forced to settle for a 32-yard field goal by Joe Nedney. The San Francisco lead lasted exactly 12 seconds, as Allen Rossum returned to ensuing kickoff for a touchdown to give Pittsburgh a 7–3 advantage. The Niners went 3-and-out on their next drive, but they sacked Steelers quarterback Ben Roethlisberger and forced him to fumble on the Steelers' second offensive play from scrimmage. San Francisco recovered the fumble at the Pittsburgh 22 and drove to the 4, but was held to another Nedney field goal, this one from 22 yards out, to cut the Steelers' lead to 1. The teams exchanged punts until late in the second quarter, when Pittsburgh drove 80 yards on 12 plays which culminated in a Roethlisberger touchdown pass to Jerame Tuman to give the Steelers a 14–6 lead into the half.

Pittsburgh took the ball to begin the second half, and drove to the San Francisco 18 before being stopped (a catch by Heath Miller at the 49ers 2 yard line was overturned after a successful challenge by San Francisco head coach Mike Nolan showed that Miller was out of bounds). The Steelers were forced to settle for a 36-yard field goal by Jeff Reed to increase their lead to 17–6. On the 49ers' ensuing drive, Alex Smith hit leaping tight end Vernon Davis at the Pittsburgh 5 yard line when he was hit by strong safety Troy Polamalu and flipped into the air. Davis hit the ground, and the ball popped up and was caught by free safety Ryan Clark, who returned it into San Francisco territory. Nolan challenged the play, arguing that Davis was down by contact at the Pittsburgh 5. Referee Gerry Austin ruled instead that the ball had hit the ground, and that the pass was therefore incomplete (the Niners still won the challenge, as the original call of an interception was overturned). The 49ers could not drive any further, and Nedney kicked a 49-yard field goal to make it 17–9, Pittsburgh. The Steelers got the ball back after the field goal and drove deep into 49ers territory before Reed kicked a 49-yard field goal on the first play of the fourth quarter to give the Steelers a 20–9 lead. The 49ers' next drive resulted in a punt, and the Steelers drove into field goal range again. Reed's 35-yard kick was good, and the Steelers led 23–9. On the ensuing possession by San Francisco was facing a crucial 3rd and 5 from their own 42. Smith forced a throw into coverage, and it was intercepted by Steeler cornerback Bryant McFadden and returned for a touchdown to give Pittsburgh a commanding 30–9 lead. Smith drove the 49ers down the field on their next possession, and he threw a 21-yard touchdown pass to Taylor Jacobs to give San Francisco its first and only touchdown of the day. The 49ers tried to execute an onside kick, but Nedney's kick was recovered by Steeler punter Daniel Sepulveda. The Steelers then attempted to run out the clock by handing the ball off to backup running back Najeh Davenport, but Davenport broke a 39-yard touchdown run with under 2 minutes to go to give the Steelers a 37–16 lead, which would be the final score. The Niners attempted one last drive, but could not even gain a first down.

With the win Pittsburgh became one of five NFL teams to increase its record to 3–0, while San Francisco dropped to 2–1. Pittsburgh quarterback Ben Roethlisberger was 13 of 20 for 160 yards with a touchdown and a lost fumble, while Alex Smith was 17 of 35 for 209 yards with a touchdown and an interception. Both were sacked twice. Willie Parker ran for 133 yards on 24 carries, while Frank Gore was held to 39 yards on 14 carries.

Week 4 (Sunday September 30, 2007): at Arizona Cardinals 

Coming off their interconference home win over the 49ers, the Steelers flew to University of Phoenix Stadium for an  interconference duel with the Arizona Cardinals, in what turned out to be a preview of next year's Super Bowl. Near the end of the first quarter, Pittsburgh delivered the first punch as QB Ben Roethlisberger completed a 43-yard TD pass to WR Santonio Holmes for the only score of the period.  However, after a scoreless second quarter, the Cardinals responded with back-up QB Kurt Warner completing a 6-yard TD pass to WR Jerheme Urban for the only score of the period.  In the fourth quarter, things went wrong for the Steelers as Arizona took the lead with WR Steve Breaston returning a punt 73 yards for a touchdown, while RB Edgerrin James got a 2-yard TD run.  Pittsburgh tried to mount a comeback as Roethlisberger and Holmes hooked up with each other again on a 7-yard TD pass.  However, the Steelers' final drive ended with an interception.

With the loss, Pittsburgh fell to 3–1.

Week 5 (Sunday October 7, 2007): vs. Seattle Seahawks 

Trying to rebound from their road loss to the Cardinals, the Steelers went home for a Week 5 interconference duel with the Seattle Seahawks, in the rematch of Super Bowl XL.  Going into the game, Pittsburgh was without Hines Ward, Santonio Holmes, Troy Polamalu, and Casey Hampton, due to injuries.

After a scoreless first quarter, the Steelers drew first blood with QB Ben Roethlisberger completing a 13-yard TD pass to TE Heath Miller to lead 7–0 at halftime.  In the second half, Pittsburgh completed the shutout with RB Najeh Davenport running 1 yard for a TD in the third quarter and 5 yards for a TD in the fourth.

With the win, Pittsburgh entered its bye week at 4–1.  During the game, the Steelers had over 40 minutes of possession, including 25 minutes of the second half.  In their first five games Pittsburgh had outscored its opponents 57–6 in the first half.  The Steelers also improved to 4–0 on the year when RB Willie Parker has a 100-yard rushing game, as he ran 28 times for 102 yards.

Week 6 (Sunday October 14, 2007): Bye Week

The Steelers did not take part in any trades or acquisitions during their bye week. They were able to give their injured players an extra week to heal as Hines Ward, Santonio Holmes, Troy Polamalu, and Casey Hampton were all sidelined due to injuries.

Week 7 (Sunday October 21, 2007): at Denver Broncos 

Coming off of a bye week, the Steelers flew to INVESCO Field at Mile High for a Sunday night intraconference clash with the Denver Broncos.  In the first quarter, Pittsburgh struck first with QB Ben Roethlisberger completing a 1-yard TD pass to TE Heath Miller.  Afterwards, the Broncos responded with QB Jay Cutler completing a 15-yard TD pass to WR Brandon Stokley.  In the second quarter, the Steelers struggled as Cutler completed a 1-yard TD pass to FB Cecil Sapp, along with DE Tim Crowder returning a fumble 50 yards for a touchdown.

In the third quarter, Pittsburgh tried to recover with Roethlisberger completing a 13-yard TD pass to WR Santonio Holmes, but the Broncos answered with Cutler completing a 1-yard TD pass to TE Tony Scheffler.  In the fourth quarter, Pittsburgh managed to tie the game with Roethlisberger completing a 13-yard TD pass to rookie TE Matt Spaeth, along with a 12-yard TD pass to Miller.  Unfortunately, Denver managed to get kicker Jason Elam to nail a last-second 49-yard field goal.

With the loss, the Steelers fell to 4–2.

Pittsburgh's defense, which had given up only 5 touchdowns in their first 5 games, gave up 3 on the night.

Week 8 (Sunday October 28, 2007): at Cincinnati Bengals 

Trying to rebound from their last-second road loss to the Broncos, the Steelers flew to Paul Brown Stadium for a Week 8 AFC North brawl with the Cincinnati Bengals.  In the first quarter, Pittsburgh trailed early as Bengals kicker Shayne Graham managed to get a 31-yard field goal.  Fortunately, the Steelers took the lead with QB Ben Roethlisberger completing a 21-yard TD pass to WR Hines Ward.  In the second quarter, Pittsburgh increased its lead with Roethlisberger and Ward hooking up with each other again on a 6-yard TD pass to lead 14–3.  With 2:16 left in the second quarter on 4th-and-1 at the Steelers 2, Cincinnati chose to kick a 20-yard field goal and received loud boos from the hometown crowd upon successfully doing so.  In a similar situation two minutes later, Steelers RB Willie Parker ran 1 yard into the end zone to put the Steelers up 21–6 at the end of the first half.

After a scoreless third quarter, the Bengals tried to make a fourth quarter comeback as QB Carson Palmer completed a 9-yard TD pass to WR T. J. Houshmandzadeh.  Pittsburgh wrapped up the victory with kicker Jeff Reed nailing a 40-yard field goal.

With the win, the Steelers improved to 5–2.

Week 9 (Monday November 5, 2007): vs. Baltimore Ravens 

Coming off their divisional road win over the Bengals, the Steelers went home, donned their throwback uniforms again, and played a Week 9 Monday Night divisional duel with the Baltimore Ravens.  In the first quarter, Pittsburgh came out strong as QB Ben Roethlisberger completed a 17-yard TD pass to TE Heath Miller and a 15-yard TD pass to WR Santonio Holmes.  In the second quarter, the Steelers increased their lead with Roethlisberger completing a 30-yard TD pass to WR Nate Washington, a 35-yard TD pass to Holmes, and a 7-yard TD pass to Washington.  Afterwards, the Ravens managed to avoid a shutout as RB Willis McGahee got a 33-yard TD run.  In the third quarter, Pittsburgh increased its lead with kicker Jeff Reed nailing a 22-yard field goal, while the defense continued to shut down Baltimore's offense.

With the win, their 12th straight in Monday Night Football home games, the Steelers improved to 6–2.

Ben Roethlisberger had a career game as he completed 13 of 16 passes for 209 yards and a career-high 5 touchdowns for his second career "perfect game."  LB James Harrison had a career day with three forced fumbles, a fumble recovery, an interception, and 3½ sacks.

During halftime, the Steelers honored their All-Time team.  Members included Joe Greene, Terry Bradshaw, Franco Harris, Jerome Bettis, Rod Woodson, John Stallworth, Lynn Swann, and Mel Blount.

Week 10 (Sunday November 11, 2007): vs. Cleveland Browns 

Coming off their dominating Monday Night performance against the Ravens, the Steelers stayed at home for Round 2 of the 2007 Rust Belt series against the Cleveland Browns.  In the first quarter, Pittsburgh trailed early as Browns QB Derek Anderson completed a 4-yard TD pass to TE Kellen Winslow.  The Steelers managed to get a 28-yard field goal from kicker Jeff Reed.  In the second quarter, Cleveland increased its lead with Anderson completing a 2-yard TD pass to FB Lawrence Vickers, while Pittsburgh only managed to have Reed kick a 35-yard field goal.  Afterwards, the Browns continued their fast start with Anderson completing a 16-yard TD pass to WR Braylon Edwards.  The Steelers drove into the red zone once again but settled for a 30-yard field goal from Reed.  Both teams scored thrice in the first half; Cleveland led 21–9.

In the third quarter, Pittsburgh began to come back as QB Ben Roethlisberger completed a 12-yard TD pass to WR Hines Ward for the only score of the period.  In the fourth quarter, the Steelers took the lead with Roethlisberger getting a career-best 30-yard TD run.  Cleveland WR/KR Joshua Cribbs returned the ensuing kickoff 100 yards for a touchdown.  Pittsburgh on their next drive retook the lead with Roethlisberger completing a 2-yard TD pass to TE Heath Miller.  The Browns tried to force overtime with a late field goal, but kicker Phil Dawson's 53-yard attempt came up short with 6 seconds left.

With their ninth straight win over Cleveland, the Steelers improved to 7–2 increasing the all-time series to 57–55.

Week 11 (Sunday November 18, 2007): at New York Jets 

Coming off their season-sweep over the Browns, the Steelers flew to The Meadowlands for a Week 11 intraconference duel with the New York Jets.  In the first quarter, Pittsburgh surprisingly fell behind early as Jets QB Kellen Clemens completed a 1-yard TD pass to TE Chris Baker, along with kicker Mike Nugent getting a 25-yard field goal.  In the second quarter, the Steelers got on the board with QB Ben Roethlisberger completing a 7-yard TD pass to WR Santonio Holmes.  New York would end the half with Nugent kicking a 19-yard field goal.

In the third quarter, Pittsburgh tied the game with kicker Jeff Reed getting a 37-yard and a 33-yard field goal.  In the fourth quarter, the Steelers took the lead with Reed getting a 48-yard field goal.  However, the Jets managed to tie the game with Nugent kicking a 28-yard field goal.  In overtime, New York managed to pull off the upset as Nugent nailed the game-winning 38-yard field goal.

With the surprising loss, Pittsburgh fell to 7–3.

Even worse, the Steelers highly ranked rushing defense allowed its first 100-yard rusher since 2005 (Edgerrin James of the Colts) as RB Thomas Jones got 30 carries for 117 yards.

Week 12 (Monday November 26, 2007): vs. Miami Dolphins 

Coming off their disappointing loss to the Jets, the Steelers went home for a Week 12 Monday Night intraconference duel with the winless Miami Dolphins.

Playing in heavy rain with a delay due to lightning, the game remained scoreless through 59 minutes and 43 seconds, becoming the longest scoreless tie since November 7, 1943. In the end, Pittsburgh came through with kicker Jeff Reed nailing the game-winning 24-yard field goal with 17 seconds left for the game's lone points.

With the win, the Steelers improved to 8–3.  Also, not only did they improve their home record to 6–0, but this also marked their 13th-straight home win on Monday Night Football.  This game would also be crowned as the lowest-scoring game in Monday Night Football history. It was the lowest scoring NFL game since December 11, 1993, when the New York Jets defeated Washington by the same score.

Week 13 (Sunday December 2, 2007): vs. Cincinnati Bengals 

Coming off their Monday Night slushfest victory over the Dolphins, the Steelers stayed at home for a Week 13 Sunday night divisional rematch with the Cincinnati Bengals.  In the first quarter, Pittsburgh trailed early as Bengals RB Rudi Johnson got a 1-yard TD run for the only score of the period.  In the second quarter, the Steelers took the lead with QB Ben Roethlisberger getting a 6-yard TD run, kicker Jeff Reed getting a 21-yard field goal, and Roethlisberger completing a 2-yard TD pass to WR Hines Ward.  In the third quarter, Cincinnati tried to fight back as kicker Shayne Graham nailed a 24-yard field goal.  However, Pittsburgh responded with Roethlisberger and Ward hooking up with each other again on an 8-yard TD pass.

With the win, the Steelers improved to 9–3, along with improving this year's home record to 7–0.  It also marked the first time since 2004 that Pittsburgh managed to sweep the Bengals.

With his two touchdown receptions, Hines Ward surpassed John Stallworth for the most career touchdown receptions in franchise history with 64.

Week 14 (Sunday December 9, 2007): at New England Patriots 

Coming off their Sunday Night divisional home win over the Bengals, the Steelers flew to Gillette Stadium for a Week 14 intraconference duel with the undefeated New England Patriots.  In the first quarter, Pittsburgh struck first with kicker Jeff Reed getting a 23-yard field goal.  Afterwards, the Patriots took the lead with QB Tom Brady completing a 4-yard TD pass to WR Randy Moss.  In the second quarter, New England increased their lead with Brady and Moss hooking up with each other again on a 63-yard TD pass.  Afterwards, the Steelers responded with QB Ben Roethlisberger completing a 32-yard TD pass to RB Najeh Davenport, along with Reed kicking a 44-yard field goal.  New England would end the half with kicker Stephen Gostkowski getting a 42-yard field goal.

In the third quarter, the Patriots took control as Brady lateraled to Moss, who lateraled back to Brady, and then threw a 56-yard TD pass to WR Jabar Gaffney.  Afterwards, New England increased its lead with Brady completing a 2-yard TD pass to WR Wes Welker.  In the fourth quarter, the Patriots sealed the win with Gostkowski nailing a 28-yard field goal.

With the loss, Pittsburgh fell to 9–4.

The loss also made the Steelers' road record fall to 2–4.

Week 15 (Sunday December 16, 2007): vs. Jacksonville Jaguars 

Hoping to rebound from their road loss to the Patriots, the Steelers went home for a Week 15 duel with the Jacksonville Jaguars.  In the first quarter, Pittsburgh trailed early as Jaguars kicker Josh Scobee nailed a 36-yard field goal.  In the second quarter, the Steelers took the lead as QB Ben Roethlisberger completed an 18-yard TD pass to TE Heath Miller.  Jacksonville regained the lead as QB David Garrard completed a 12-yard TD pass to WR Ernest Wilford.

In the third quarter, Pittsburgh fell further behind as Garrard completed a 3-yard TD pass to WR Reggie Williams and a 55-yard TD pass to WR Dennis Northcutt. The extra point attempts on both of these touchdowns failed. In the fourth quarter, the Steelers rallied to tie the game with Roethlisberger completing an 11-yard TD pass to WR Hines Ward and a 30-yard TD pass to WR Nate Washington, with the later being followed by WR Cedric Wilson completing a 2-point conversion pass to WR Santonio Holmes on a trick play.  On the Jaguars' ensuing offensive drive RB Fred Taylor scored on a 12-yard TD run.  The Steelers' next drive ended just a half-yard short on a fourth-down conversion attempt with 41 seconds remaining.

With their first home loss of the year, the Steelers fell to 9–5.  This was also the second game this year that Pittsburgh's defense had given up a 100-yard rusher: Fred Taylor ran 25 times for 147 yards and a touchdown.

Week 16 (Thursday December 20, 2007): at St. Louis Rams 

Trying to snap a two-game losing skid, the Steelers flew to the Edward Jones Dome for a Week 16 Thursday night interconference duel with the St. Louis Rams.  In the first quarter, Pittsburgh smashed first as QB Ben Roethlisberger completed a 17-yard TD pass to WR Nate Washington.  The Rams would respond with QB Marc Bulger completing a 12-yard TD pass to RB Steven Jackson.  In the second quarter, the Steelers regained the lead with kicker Jeff Reed getting a 21-yard field goal.  However, St. Louis took the lead with Bulger completing a 12-yard TD pass to WR Isaac Bruce.  Afterwards, Pittsburgh got the lead again as Roethlisberger completed a 33-yard TD pass to Washington and a 12-yard TD pass to RB Najeh Davenport.  The Rams end the half with kicker Jeff Wilkins getting a 52-yard field goal.

In the third quarter, the Steelers increased their lead with Davenport getting a 1-yard TD run.  St. Louis would respond with Bulger completing a 23-yard TD pass to WR Drew Bennett.  In the fourth quarter, Pittsburgh ended the game with Reed nailing a 29-yard field goal and CB Ike Taylor returning an interception 51 yards for a touchdown.

With the win, the Steelers improved to 10–5. The Cleveland Browns' loss three days later automatically clinched the Steelers' first AFC North title since 2004.

WR Hines Ward (6 receptions for 59 yards) surpassed John Stallworth as the all-time franchise leader in career reception yards with 8,726 yards.  Also, Santonio Holmes got a career-high with his game-best 133 receiving yards on 4 catches. Finally, Ben Roethlisberger got his third career "perfect" game (16/20 for 261 yards and 3 touchdowns).

RB Willie Parker (1 carry for −1 yard) got injured on Pittsburgh's second offensive play of the game after getting tackled by LB Will Witherspoon.  He would suffer a fractured right fibula, effectively ending his season.

Week 17 (Sunday December 30, 2007): at Baltimore Ravens 

Following their road win over the Rams, the Steelers closed out the regular season with a Week 17 AFC North rematch with the Baltimore Ravens.  Because Pittsburgh already clinched a playoff berth (via winning the division), most of their key players sat out the game.

In the first quarter, the Steelers trailed early as Ravens RB Musa Smith got a 2-yard TD run, along with kicker Matt Stover managed to get a 28-yard field goal.  In the second quarter, Pittsburgh continued to trail as RB Cory Ross got a 32-yard TD run.  The Steelers would respond with RB Najeh Davenport getting a 1-yard TD run.  Baltimore would end the half with Stover nailing a 31-yard field goal.

In the third quarter, Baltimore increased its lead with QB Troy Smith completing a 15-TD pass to WR Devard Darling for the only score of the period.  In the fourth quarter, Pittsburgh tried to rally as QB Charlie Batch completed a 59-yard TD pass to WR Santonio Holmes and a 7-yard TD pass to WR Cedric Wilson.  However, the Ravens managed to hold on for the win.

With the loss, the Steelers ended the regular season at 10–6 and with the AFC's No. 4 seed.

Playoffs

Schedule

AFC Wild Card Playoff (Saturday January 5, 2008): vs. Jacksonville Jaguars

Game summary
Entering the playoffs as the AFC's No. 4 seed, the Steelers began their playoff run at home in the AFC Wildcard Round against the fifth-seeded Jacksonville Jaguars in a rematch of Week 15 where Pittsburgh nearly came back to win.

In the first quarter, the Steelers got the first punch by capping the game's opening drive with RB Najeh Davenport getting a 1-yard TD run.  The Jaguars would immediately respond as RB Fred Taylor got a 1-yard TD run following a 96-yard kick-off return by RB Maurice Jones-Drew.  In the second quarter, Pittsburgh trailed as CB Rashean Mathis returned an interception 63 yards for a touchdown and QB David Garrard completed a 43-yard TD pass to Jones-Drew.

In the third quarter, Pittsburgh responded with kicker Jeff Reed getting a 28-yard field goal, but Jacksonville responded with Maurice Jones-Drew getting a 10-yard TD run.  In the fourth quarter, the Steelers began to come back as QB Ben Roethlisberger completed a 37-yard TD pass to WR Santonio Holmes and a 14-yard TD pass to TE Heath Miller (with the latter having a failed two-point conversion), while Davenport got another 1-yard TD run (with another failed two-point conversion) to take a one-point lead.  However, the Jaguars regained the lead with kicker Josh Scobee nailing a 25-yard field goal.  Pittsburgh regained the ball afterwards, but Jacksonville immediately forced and recovered the fumble, effectively ending any possibility of a comeback.

With the loss, the Steelers ended their season with an overall record of 10–7.  It was guard Alan Faneca's last game as a Steeler.

References

External links 
 2007 Pittsburgh Steelers season at Pro Football Reference 
 2007 Pittsburgh Steelers season statistics at jt-sw.com 

Pittsburgh Steelers seasons
Pittsburgh
AFC North championship seasons
Pitts